"Make Your Own Kind of Music" is a pop song written by Barry Mann and Cynthia Weil, which became a Top 40 hit for Cass Elliot in 1969.

Cass Elliot version

Overview
The Cass Elliot version of the song is in the key of E major.
She recorded "Make Your Own Kind of Music" after she had a hit in the summer of 1969 with "It's Getting Better", another Mann/Weil composition and the second single from her second solo album, Bubblegum, Lemonade and... Something for Mama. That album had been produced by Dunhill Records vice-president of A&R Steve Barri, who said: "[Since Dunhill] didn't have much success with [the debut Cass Elliot solo album Dream a Little Dream we wanted to get her back on the [upper] charts and we tried to find some commercial songs." Barri would also attribute the bubblegum music focus of his output with Elliot to a desire "to capture who she was ... this real fun-loving positive ... person I couldn't imagine anybody ... not loving." In a September 1969 Melody Maker interview a week prior to the US release of the "Make Your Own Kind of Music" single, Elliot stated: "Bubblegum music is very pleasant to listen to ... but it's like they say about Chinese food: half an hour after tasting it you are hungry again", although she did concede "maybe [bubblegum] is what I am supposed to be doing [since] my voice is very light ... I just can't sing heavy material". Elliot would be less easygoing in her 1971 summation of her 1968–1970 tenure with Dunhill Records, saying she had been "forced to be so bubblegum that I'd stick to the floor when I walked." Barri, while admitting—also in 1971—that "Cass was one artist I couldn't find the answer for," would maintain: "We never recorded anything that she didn't want to do."

Elliot had also told Melody Maker that "It's Getting Better" was "musically ... not quite what I want to be doing ... It's a good recording for what it is, but you wouldn't exactly call it social commentary." "Make Your Own Kind of Music", while similar in structure to "It's Getting Better", could be considered social commentary: Steve Barri would rank "Make Your Own Kind of Music" in with "pop songs [that] really kind of say something". Released in October 1969, "Make Your Own Kind of Music" swiftly ascended the Hot 100 in Billboard, and in November 1969 Dunhill reissued Elliot's second solo album reformatted to include "Make Your Own Kind of Music", the album's title being changed to It's Getting Better/ Make Your Own Kind of Music. Steve Barri considered "Make Your Own Kind of Music" to be a guaranteed Top Ten hit; the single would garner heavy radio airplay but comparatively meager sales, stalling at #36 on the Hot 100 ("Make Your Own Kind of Music" would reach #6 on the airplay driven Billboard Easy Listening chart).

The follow-up single to "Make Your Own Kind of Music": "New World Coming"—another Mann/ Weil composition—was similarly a sugarcoated message song and would have similar soft chart impact—with a #42 Hot 100 peak—signaling Elliot's challenges in maintaining a profile as a current hitmaker, as the 1960s turned into the 1970s. Dunhill Records president Jay Lasker would say of the underperformance of "New World Coming": "The message here—at least to us—is that 'the message record has had it'. [Now] Mama Cass is going to do love songs." The followup to "New World Coming", "A Song That Never Comes", would be Elliot's final single to reach the Hot 100, spending two weeks at #99 in August 1970. Dunhill released Elliott's third solo album in October 1970, Mama's Big Ones, compiling seven of her eight Hot 100 singles plus some previously unreleased tracks, as her final solo album on the label. Subsequent to the one-off collaborative album Dave Mason & Cass Elliot on Blue Thumb, Dunhill announced in July 1970 that Elliot would reunite with her former bandmates for a final Mamas & Papas album, after which she would depart Dunhill to record for RCA Victor.

In an August 14 2019 "Staff Picks" ranking of The 100 Best Songs of 1969 in Billboard, Elliott's "Make Your Own Kind of Music" was ranked at #89, with the evaluation: "Though just a modest hit, Elliot's ode to striking out on your own was a crucial evolution in self-referential pop. [In 1968] her debut album [had] stiffed, and ... her three-week Vegas residency [infamously] closed after a single awful performance. In this light, the sunshine pop of 'Make Your Own Kind of Music' ... sparkled even more defiantly."

The presiding rabbi at Elliot's funeral on 3 August 1974 included the lyrics of "Make Your Own Kind of Music" in the eulogy.

Elliot's recording of "Make Your Own Kind of Music" would be featured prominently in the television show Lost, first appearing in the episode "Man of Science, Man of Faith", and was rated as one of Spin magazine's "Best Musical Moments From TV's Latest Golden Age". The song also was used multiple times in the Showtime series Dexter, including an episode with the same title as the song. 

The track's uses on television also include a 2015 episode ("The Graduate") of The Middle, set to a flashback montage of a character's high school experiences during her high school graduation ceremony; in season two, episode seven of Sex Education;
and as the theme song for the Swedish documentary show I en annan del av Köping.

The song also appears on the soundtrack to the films Beautiful Thing and Free Guy.

After "Make Your Own Kind of Music" was used in the 2022 movie The Unbearable Weight of Massive Talent, the song became a meme on TikTok and was used in 46,000 videos.

Chart performance (Cass Elliot version)

Remixes
A remixed version of the Cass Elliot track was featured in the 1997 Dance compilation Dance Across The Universe (Part 1), which was released by Universal Records, along with a separate club-only promo which featured four different mixes (one of them dubbed "The Mama Cass Mix"). This version would reach #11 on the Dance Club Songs chart in Billboard.

Paloma Faith version

Overview
"Make Your Own Kind of Music" became a Top 30 hit in the United Kingdom in 2018 via a remake by Paloma Faith.

It was announced 1 February 2018 that Škoda Auto had commissioned Paloma Faith to record a version of  "Make Your Own Kind of Music" to serve as jingle for an ad campaign  to launch the Karoq, Škoda's new compact crossover SUV,  Faith being quoted as saying: "The reality of Škoda is it was the car people took the piss out of you for having...That's how they enticed me in really, it was like that thing or person who people tease for being who they are but is now celebrated for being who they are." Faith has since introduced "Make Your Own Kind of Music" in concert with the statement that "she doesn't usually approve of celebrity endorsements for products, but felt that Škoda was a brand worth celebrating due to how it's gradually become more respected over the years."

The track was made available for streaming as of 2 March 2018 with a promotional video made available 20 March 2018, with a year-long television ad campaign featuring a 60 second edit of the video inaugurated on 24 March 2018: "the [video] follows Paloma through a series of flashbacks as she fights to make it in the music industry. It depicts her struggling to fit in as a young child to performing to empty pubs, to an iconic moment early in her career where she rebukes a music executive for not listening to her sing. The flashbacks are juxtaposed with images of her now as she enjoys chart-topping success and a new period in her life as a mother." (Faith had given birth to her first child in December 2016.)

"Make Your Own Kind of Music" debuted on the UK chart dated 19 April 2018 at #59 to enter the Top 40 at #28 on the chart dated 10 May 2018. The track spent only that one week in the Top 40, its typical chart ranking during its ten week chart tenure being between #43 and #49; however, the track was certified silver for sales of 200,000 units. Included in the tracklist of Faith's fourth studio album; The Architect, on sites such as Spotify and Apple Music as of 20 April 2018, "Make Your Own Kind of Music" was officially added to the album's tracklist on its 16 November 2018 re-release: labeled The Zeitgist Edition, this re-release also added "Lullaby" to the tracks on the original album.

Charts

Certifications

Other versions
The first recording of "Make Your Own Kind of Music" was on a 1968 single by the New York City-based trio the Will-O-Bees (Janet Blossom, Steven Porter, and Robert Merchanthouse), who regularly performed Mann/Weil compositions.

In 1972, Barbra Streisand's concert album Live Concert at the Forum featured the medley "Sing"/ "Make Your Own Kind Of Music"; released as a single, it reached #94 on the Billboard Hot 100, and #28 on the magazine's Easy Listening chart. On her 1973 album Barbra Streisand...And Other Musical Instruments Streisand sings "Make Your Own Kind of Music" in a medley with "The World is a Concerto".

"Make Your Own Kind of Music" has also been recorded by Roslyn Kind (on This is Roslyn Kind, 1969); Bobby Sherman (on Here Comes Bobby, 1970); Marilyn Maye (on Girl Singer, 1970); Paul Westerberg (on a flexidisc with The Bob magazine #53 and on the "Love Untold" single, 1996); Telly Leung (on Songs for You, 2015) and Cock Robin (on Chinese Driver, 2016).

References

External links
 Discography for the song
  (Mama Cass)
 Remix by DJ Mathieu Bouthier and Muttonheads

1968 songs
1969 singles
Cass Elliot songs
Barbra Streisand songs
Dunhill Records singles
Songs with lyrics by Cynthia Weil
Songs written by Barry Mann
Songs about music

2018 singles
Paloma Faith songs
Sony Music UK singles
Song recordings produced by TMS (production team)